The Dilly Hotel is a historic 5-star hotel located at 21 Piccadilly in London, England.

History 
The hotel opened in 1908 as The Piccadilly Hotel. It was bought by Le Méridien in 1986 and renamed Le Méridien Piccadilly.

In 2010, Starman Hotels, a joint venture between Starwood Capital Group and Lehman Brothers, sold the hotel for £64 million to Host Hotels & Resorts, Dutch pension fund APG and Singaporean sovereign wealth fund GIC. In 2019, APG and GIC bought out Host's share, forming Archer Hotel Capital. The hotel left Marriott on November 26, 2020 and was renamed The Dilly Hotel. In 2022, Archer Hotel Capital sold the hotel to Israel-based Fattal Hotels, which announced plans for a £90 million renovation to reposition the property as a luxury hotel.

The Dilly has a health club with an indoor swimming pool, steam room and massage facilities. It is also home to its very own dance studio where world-competitors practice, and two squash courts. Terrace at The Dilly is the main restaurant, a botanical oasis with views overlooking Piccadilly.

References

External links

The Dilly Hotel official website

Hotels in London
Buildings and structures on Piccadilly
Hotel buildings completed in 1908
Hotels established in 1908